1 Chronicles 21 is the twenty-first chapter of the Books of Chronicles in the Hebrew Bible or the First Book of Chronicles in the Old Testament of the Christian Bible. The book is compiled from older sources by an unknown person or group, designated by modern scholars as "the Chronicler", and had the final shape established in late fifth or fourth century BCE. This chapter records the account of David's census, its consequences and the purchase of a site for the temple. The whole chapter belongs to the section focusing on the kingship of David (1 Chronicles 9:35 to 29:30).

Text
This chapter was originally written in the Hebrew language. It is divided into 30 verses.

Textual witnesses
Some early manuscripts containing the text of this chapter in Hebrew are of the Masoretic Text tradition, which includes the Aleppo Codex (10th century), and Codex Leningradensis (1008).

Extant manuscripts of a Koine Greek translation known as the Septuagint, made in the last few centuries BCE, include Codex Vaticanus (B; B; 4th century), Codex Alexandrinus (A; A; 5th century) and Codex Marchalianus (Q; Q; 6th century).

Old Testament references
: ; 
:
:
:

David’s military census (21:1–6)
The Chronicler reinterprets and supplements the account in 2 Samuel 24, taking the perspective of Job chapter 1. Instead of "the anger of the " (2 Samuel 24:1), the one who persuaded David to carry out a census is "Satan", a Hebrew word which should be translated as "an adversary" rather than a personal name, more likely is the same figure mentioned in ff and Zechariah 3:1ff.
David's guilt is pronounced strongly by Joab (more than in  2 Samuel 24) as the word 'trespass' (verse 3; NRSV, 'guilt') is used to emphasize David's responsibility. The Chronicler simply documents the result of the census, excluding the individual stages (due to its insignificance or incomprehensibility) recorded in 2 Samuel 24.

Verse 5
And Joab gave the sum of the numbering of the people to David. In all Israel there were 1,100,000 men who drew the sword, and in Judah 470,000 who drew the sword.

Verse 6
But he did not count Levi and Benjamin among them, for the king’s word was abominable to Joab.
 forbids to take a military census among the Levites, whereas the tribe of Benjamin was probably excluded because 'the tabernacle resided upon its territory'.

Judgment for David’s sin (21:7–13)
The passage emphasizes on YHWH's disapproval, not David's remorse (as in 2 Samuel 24) because David was persuaded by Satan, so it has the statement 'he struck Israel' forecasting the events reported in verse 14.

A plague on Israel (21:14–17)
The sin of David resulted in the death of Israelites (verse 14; cf. ;).

Verse 14
So the Lord sent a plague throughout Israel, and seventy thousand men of Israel fell.

Verse 16
David lifted up his eyes and saw the angel of the Lord standing between earth and heaven with his sword drawn in his hand stretched out over Jerusalem. So David and the elders, covered in sackcloth, fell on their faces.
The Chronicler describes the angel hanging in the air, recalling the descriptions in Numbers 22:31 and Joshua 5:13-15 (cf. also verse 18); furthermore cf. Daniel 8:15; 12:6.

David builds an altar (21:18–30)
In verses 21–25, the purchase of Ornan's threshingfloor is patterned after Abraham's purchase of Machpelah's cave (Genesis 23), including the insistence on paying the full price (an expression used only in Genesis 23:9 and verses 22, 24). The 600 silver shekels David pays is more than Abraham's 400 silver shekels for Machpelah's cave, alluding the higher value of temple site than Sarah's burial site (600 is also a multiple of 12, an important number in various ways in the Chronicles).
Verses 29–30 explain that because an angel obstructed his way, David had to make sacrifices on Ornan's threshing-floor, instead of at the high place at Gibeon.

Verse 18
Then the angel of the Lord commanded Gad to tell David that David should go up and raise an altar to the Lord on the threshing floor of Ornan the Jebusite. 
The command to erect an altar on the threshing-floor of Ornan (the later name for Araunah) was given only by Gad in 2 Samuel 24, is clarified in Chronicles as originated from the angel of YHWH.

See also
 David's Mighty Warriors
 House of David
 Jerusalem
 Zeruiah
 Related Bible parts: Genesis 23, Exodus 30, Numbers 23, 2 Samuel 11, 2 Samuel 11, 2 Samuel 23, 2 Samuel 24, Job 1, Zechariah 3

Notes

References

Sources

External links
 Jewish translations:
 Divrei Hayamim I - I Chronicles - Chapter 21 (Judaica Press) translation [with Rashi's commentary] at Chabad.org
 Christian translations:
 Online Bible at GospelHall.org (ESV, KJV, Darby, American Standard Version, Bible in Basic English)
 First Book of Chronicles Chapter 21. Bible Gateway

21